José Rafael Vivian (born 16 June 1993), known as Zé Rafael, is a Brazilian footballer who plays as an attacking midfielder for Palmeiras.

Club career

Born in Ponta Grossa, Paraná, Zé Rafael joined Coritiba's youth setup in 2009, aged 16. He made his first team debut on 29 April 2012, coming on as a half-time substitute for Rafael Silva in a 3–1 Campeonato Paranaense away win against Roma.

Zé Rafael was definitely promoted to the first team ahead of the 2013 season, and made his Série A debut on 11 August of that year by replacing Lincoln in a 1–0 loss at Vasco da Gama. On 12 February 2014, after appearing sparingly, he was loaned to Novo Hamburgo until the end of the 2014 Campeonato Gaúcho.

Zé Rafael scored his first senior goal on 27 February 2014, netting the first in a 2–1 home win against Passo Fundo. Upon returning, he only featured rarely before joining Londrina on loan on 5 May 2015, with Paulinho moving in the opposite direction.

Zé Rafael became a regular starter at the Tubarão, helping in their promotion to Série B with two goals. He subsequently returned to Coxa, but after failing to make an appearance, he requested to leave and returned to Londrina on 11 February 2016, on loan until December.

Zé Rafael was an undisputed starter during the second division, scoring four goals in 32 appearances as his side finished sixth, three points away from another promotion; highlights included a brace in a 2–1 away win against Vila Nova. On 6 January 2017, he signed a three-year deal with Bahia, in the first division.

Zé Rafael scored his first top tier goal on 14 May 2017, netting the equalizer in a 6–2 home routing of Atlético Paranaense.

Zé Rafael signed a five-year deal with Palmeiras on 29 November 2018. The signing cost R$14,5 million for Palmeiras and became the biggest sale in Bahia's history.

Career statistics

Honours

Club
Coritiba
Campeonato Paranaense: 2012, 2013

Bahia
Copa do Nordeste: 2017
Campeonato Baiano: 2018

Palmeiras
Campeonato Paulista: 2020, 2022
Copa do Brasil: 2020
Copa Libertadores: 2020, 2021
Recopa Sudamericana: 2022
Campeonato Brasileiro Série A: 2022

Individual
Bola de Prata: 2022

References

External links

1993 births
Living people
People from Ponta Grossa
Association football midfielders
Brazilian footballers
Campeonato Brasileiro Série A players
Campeonato Brasileiro Série B players
Campeonato Brasileiro Série C players
Coritiba Foot Ball Club players
Esporte Clube Novo Hamburgo players
Londrina Esporte Clube players
Esporte Clube Bahia players
Sociedade Esportiva Palmeiras players
Sportspeople from Paraná (state)